"One Hour After Midnight" is a poem by Hermann Hesse.

External links
Hermann Hesse; Poemhunter

References

Poetry by Hermann Hesse